Nadim Joakim Sawalha (born 9 September 1935) is a Jordanian-British actor, the father of actresses Nadia and Julia Sawalha. He appeared in two Bond films, The Spy Who Loved Me (1977) and The Living Daylights (1987).

Background
Sawalha was born in Madaba, Jordan, in 1935 and moved to Britain in the 1950s, to study drama. His daughter Julia revealed on her episode of Who Do You Think You Are? that even he is uncertain of his birth date, but it is thought to be around 7 to 9 September.

Acting career
Nadim Sawalha has made over 100 appearances in film and television, in a career spanning more than 40 years.

Personal life
Sawalha is married to Roberta Mary Lane, and has three daughters, Nadia, Julia and Dina. His brother is comedian Nabil Sawalha.

Filmography

Film

Television

Other roles
He played the part of Omar Badri in BBC's 'CDX' computer game.
In the 2018 BBC Radio 4 miniseries A Tale of Two Cities: Aleppo and London, he played the role of "Dr. Mahmoud".

References

External links

1935 births
Living people
English male film actors
English male television actors
English people of Jordanian descent
Jordanian emigrants to the United Kingdom
People from Madaba Governorate
20th-century English male actors
21st-century English male actors